Giordano Cottur (24 May 1914 – 8 March 2006) was an Italian cyclist. He was born in Trieste. His palmarès include three 3rd places overall at the Giro d'Italia (1940, 1948 and 1949, plus five stage wins) and an 8th overall at the 1947 Tour de France.

Major results

1938
Giro d'Italia:
Winner stage 9
1939
Giro d'Italia:
Winner stage 12
7th place overall classification
Giro dell'Umbria
1940
Giro d'Italia:
3rd place overall classification
1946
Giro d'Italia:
Winner stage 1
8th place overall classification
1947
Giro d'Italia:
Winner stage 6
Tour de France:
8th place overall classification
1948
Giro d'Italia:
Winner stage 1
3rd place overall classification
1949
Giro d'Italia:
3rd place overall classification

References

External links 
 Biography of Giordano Cottur 

Official Tour de France results for Giordano Cottur

1914 births
2006 deaths
Sportspeople from Trieste
People from Austrian Littoral
Italian male cyclists
Cyclists from Friuli Venezia Giulia